Donovan Ashton Simmonds (born 12 October 1988 in Walthamstow) is an English footballer who last played for Kingstonian. He plays as a striker.

Simmonds began his youth career with London side Charlton Athletic, before moving to Coventry City where he failed to make any appearances. He spent two spells on loan with Gillingham and in the Scottish Premier League with Kilmarnock, before being released in 2009.

He spent a short spell with Maltese club Floriana, before returning to the United Kingdom to sign for Greenock Morton in the Scottish Football League First Division. Simmonds signed for Conference North club Nuneaton Town in September 2010, and for Dover Athletic two months later. He later signed for Chelmsford City in September 2012.

Playing career

Coventry City
Simmonds joined Coventry City on a free transfer, signing a two-year deal following his release from the Charlton Athletic academy at the end of the 2006–07 season.

Simmonds had impressed while on trial, playing in two friendly matches and a testimonial match against Nuneaton Borough, in which he netted in a 5–0 win. He was one of a number of Coventry signings to have previously worked with manager Iain Dowie during their brief time together at Charlton.

Gillingham
On 28 March 2008, it was announced that Simmonds had joined Gillingham on loan until the end of the season, where he was given the number 2 (a number usually associated with right-backs). Simmonds made his Gills debut in a 2–1 home win against Luton Town on 1 April.

Kilmarnock
On 13 August 2008 Simmonds joined Kilmarnock on a loan deal set to last until 5 January 2009. Simmonds scored his debut Killie goal with a late header against Falkirk after coming on as a sub. In December, Kilmarnock announced that his loan deal had been extended until the end of the season.

Floriana
On 19 August 2009, it was confirmed that Simmonds had joined Maltese Premier League side Floriana, following his release from Coventry.

Simmonds scored his first goal since joining the Greens in the 1–0 win over Hamrun Spartans on 4 October 2009.

After leaving Floriana, Simmonds trained with Greenock Morton, playing two trial matches to try to win a deal.

Greenock Morton
Simmonds signed for Scottish First Division side Morton on 27 February 2010, until the end of the season.

He was released by Morton at the end of the 2009–10 season.

Rushden & Diamonds
Simmonds signed a contract with Rushden & Diamonds on 6 August 2010.

Nuneaton Town
He then signed for Conference North outfit Nuneaton Town on 20 September 2010 and played his debut less than 24 hours later in Nuneaton's 3–0 defeat of Harrogate Town.

Dover Athletic
Simmonds returned to Kent for his third club in less than half a season, joining Dover Athletic in December 2010 and scoring on his début against Maidenhead United.

He was released in May 2012 by the club.

Chelmsford City
Simmonds signed for Conference South club Chelmsford in September 2012. He scored two goals and made an assist in an FA Cup 1st round tie with local rivals Colchester United, which Chelmsford won 3–1.

Tilbury
In November 2013, Simmonds signed for Isthmian League club, Tilbury and featured regularly in their starting lineup, before leaving the club at the end of the season.

Tamworth
On 2 August 2014, Donovan joined Conference North side Tamworth following a successful trial period, and was joined on the same day by Brendon Daniels and George Grayson.

Bishop's Stortford
Simmonds joined Bishop's Stortford in October 2014.

References

External links

1988 births
Living people
Footballers from Walthamstow
Association football forwards
English footballers
English expatriate footballers
Charlton Athletic F.C. players
Coventry City F.C. players
Gillingham F.C. players
Kilmarnock F.C. players
Floriana F.C. players
Greenock Morton F.C. players
Rushden & Diamonds F.C. players
Nuneaton Borough F.C. players
Dover Athletic F.C. players
Chelmsford City F.C. players
Boreham Wood F.C. players
Tilbury F.C. players
Tamworth F.C. players
Bishop's Stortford F.C. players
VCD Athletic F.C. players
Kingstonian F.C. players
English Football League players
Isthmian League players
Scottish Premier League players
Scottish Football League players
Expatriate footballers in Malta
Black British sportsmen